Ambatondrazaka is a city (commune urbaine) in Madagascar

Ambatondrazaka is also the capital of the Alaotra-Mangoro region and the Ambatondrazaka District.

Geography 

The city is situated south of Alaotra, the greatest lake in Madagascar.

History 
The oral history states the town was founded by Randriambololona and children. The recorded history of the town begins with Radama I of Madagascar.

Religion
The city is the seat of the Roman Catholic Diocese of Ambatondrazaka (Cathedral of the Holy Trinity).

Transport 
The city is at the MLA (Moramanga-Lac Alaotra) railway. There is also an airport.

The Route nationale 44 links the city with Moramanga (at 158 km) in the south and Imerimandroso - Amboavory.

Population

Agriculture
Ambatondrazaka is a tobacco producing area in Madagascar. Some 2240 farmers in this region plant tobacco.
It is also known for its cultivation of rice.

See also
Railway stations in Madagascar

References

Cities in Madagascar
Populated places in Alaotra-Mangoro
Regional capitals in Madagascar
Tobacco in Madagascar